Remy Taye Stephon Coddington (born 3 June 2004) is a Bermudian international footballer who plays for West Ham United, as a midfielder.

Club career
Coddington began his career with North Village Rams in his native Bermuda. In March 2019, Coddington signed for AFC Bournemouth. In July 2020, Coddington signed scholarship forms with West Ham United.

International career
Coddington represented Bermuda's under-15 side during the 2019 CONCACAF Boys' Under-15 Championship, scoring three goals in four appearances.

On 5 March 2021, Coddington made his debut for Bermuda, scoring in a 3–0 victory against the Bahamas.

International goals
Scores and results list Bermuda's goal tally first.

Personal life
Coddington's father, PJ, played domestically for Devonshire Cougars and North Village Rams.

References

2004 births
Living people
Bermudian footballers
Bermuda international footballers
West Ham United F.C. players
Association football midfielders
Bermudian expatriate footballers
Expatriate footballers in England
People from Pembroke Parish